Mary Jane Farell (March 12, 1920 – 5 October 2015), also known as  Mary Jane Kauder, was an American bridge player.

Farell grew up in Cincinnati, Ohio, and "couldn't wait to get home from school to kibitz whenever my mother had the game at our house." The family moved to Los Angeles when she was 17 and she began playing duplicate bridge there "with the young men I dated". She married one of them, Arnold Kauder, who was her mentor. (They divorced.) She began teaching bridge after World War II.

Mary Jane and Arnold Kauder won the Hilliard Mixed Pairs (a secondary "national" championship after 1946) in 1949 and finished second in 1950. They were second again in 1957, behind Bob Adams and Marilyn Johnson. Johnson and Mary Jane Farell became a strong partnership and won three world championships together.

Her second husband Jules Farell died in 2005.

Farell was inducted into the ACBL Hall of Fame in 1998.

Bridge accomplishments

Honors

 ACBL Hall of Fame, 1998

Wins

 World Mixed Pairs (1) 1966
 North American Bridge Championships (14)
 von Zedtwitz Life Master Pairs (1) 1978 
 Whitehead Women's Pairs (1) 1960 
 Hilliard Mixed Pairs (1) 1959 
 Machlin Women's Swiss Teams (1) 1982 
 Wagar Women's Knockout Teams (10) 1964, 1968, 1970, 1972, 1974, 1975, 1976, 1982, 1984, 1990

Runners-up

 North American Bridge Championships
 Smith Life Master Women's Pairs (4) 1965, 1966, 1967, 1968 
 Wagar Women's Knockout Teams (4) 1961, 1967, 1973, 1987 
 Sternberg Women's Board-a-Match Teams (1) 1988 
 Chicago Mixed Board-a-Match (2) 1969, 1989

References

External links
 
 

1920 births
American contract bridge players
Sportspeople from Cincinnati
Sportspeople from Los Angeles
2015 deaths
Place of birth missing